Magnetic memory may refer to:

 Magnetic storage, the storage of data on a magnetized medium
 Magnetic-core memory, an early form of random-access memory
 Remanence, or residual magnetization, the magnetization left behind in a ferromagnet after an external magnetic field is removed
 Rock magnetism, the study of the magnetic properties of rocks, sediments and soils